Jovović  is a Serbian surname, which means little son of Jovo. 
Blagoje Jovović
Boško Jovović
Igor Jovović
Mirjana Jovović-Horvat
Nebojša Jovović
Nikola Jovović
Vladimir Jovović

See also
Jovovich (disambiguation)
Yovovich